Metapterodon ("next to Pterodon") is an extinct genus of hyainailourid hyaenodonts of the tribe Metapterodontini withnin paraphyletic subfamily Hyainailourinae, that lived in Africa during the early Oligocene to early Miocene. Fossils of Metapterodon were recovered from the Egypt, Uganda, Elisabeth Bay Formation in Namibia, and Rusinga Island and Karungu in Kenya.

Classification and phylogeny

Taxonomy
The Paleogene species Metapterodon schlosseri and Metapterodon markgrafi have been reassigned to Falcatodon and Sectisodon respectively.

Phylogeny
The phylogenetic relationships of genus Metapterodon are shown in the following cladogram:

See also
 Mammal classification
 Hyainailourinae

References

Hyaenodonts
Oligocene mammals of Africa
Miocene mammals of Africa
Fossils of Kenya
Fossils of Namibia
Fossil taxa described in 1926
Prehistoric placental genera